D9 is a state road connecting Metković border crossing to Čapljina and Mostar, Bosnia and Herzegovina and D8 state road south of Opuzen.

The road also provides connection to A1 motorway Ploče interchange and A10 motorway Kula Norinska interchange via the D62 state road and cities of Metković and Opuzen.

The road, as well as all other state roads in Croatia, is managed and maintained by Hrvatske ceste, a state-owned company.

Traffic volume 

Traffic is regularly counted and reported by Hrvatske ceste, operator of the road. Substantial variations between annual (AADT) and summer (ASDT) traffic volumes are attributed to the fact that the road carries substantial tourist traffic.

Road junctions and populated areas

Maps

Sources

See also
 Highways in Croatia

D009
D009